"Loves Me Not" was a planned fourth single for the album Dangerous and Moving by t.A.T.u. However, due to the group leaving Universal Records, the song's release was postponed, then later cancelled in all countries, except for a limited release in France. Even though it was cancelled, it is available on some countries' iTunes Music Store with only the original song. Unlike most of the duo's songs, "Loves me Not" and "All About Us" exist exclusively in English; there is no Russian-language version of either song, and English versions were included on the Russian version of the album. A video of the group performing the song at "Glam As You" in Paris was aired on a few television stations worldwide. Music and lyrics by Andy Kubiszewski and Ed Buller. Cover photo taken by Bryan Adams.

Although the song was first seen on Dangerous and Moving, it is considered the only single from The Best. A very small number of singles were printed and sold in France, using the same photo from the "Gomenasai" single. An alternate version of the song can be found on Люди Инвалиды (Lyudi invalidy).

Track listing
France Promo CD single
 "Loves Me Not"
 "Loves Me Not" (Glam As You Radio Mix By Guéna LG)
 "Loves Me Not" (Glam As You Mix By Guéna LG)
 "Loves Me Not" (Sunset In Ibiza By Guéna LG)

European Promo CD single
 "Loves Me Not"
 "Loves Me Not (Glam As You Radio mix)

Charts

Weekly charts

Year-end charts

References

External links 
 Official Lyrics

Electronic rock songs
T.A.T.u. songs
2005 songs
2006 singles
Song recordings produced by Ed Buller
Songs written by Andy Kubiszewski
Songs written by Ed Buller